Skyliners Juniors, for sponsorship reasons Fraport Skyliners Juniors, is the reserve team of German basketball club Skyliners Frankfurt. The team is based in Frankfurt. It currently plays in the ProB, the third-tier national division. To develop its young players further, the Skyliners have merged some of their youth departments with Eintracht Frankfurt Basketball.

Honours
ProB
Runners-up (1): 2015–16

Season by season

Players

Current roster

Notable players

 Jules Dang Akodo (2 seasons: 2014–15, 2017–18)
 Richard Freudenberg (3 seasons: 2017–present)
 Isaac Bonga (2 seasons: 2016–18)

References

Basketball teams in Germany